Craigleith railway station served the area of Craigleith, Edinburgh, Scotland from 1879 to 1962 on the Leith Branch and the Barnton Branch.

History 
The station opened on 1 August 1879 by the Caledonian Railway. There were two goods sidings to the east, one serving Craigleith Quarry. The station's name was changed to Craigleith for Blackhall on 1 July 1922. It closed on 30 April 1962.

References

External links 

 

Disused railway stations in Edinburgh
Former Caledonian Railway stations
Railway stations in Great Britain opened in 1879
Railway stations in Great Britain closed in 1962
1879 establishments in Scotland
1962 disestablishments in Scotland